Dragusha is an Albanian surname. Notable people with the surname include:

 Alban Dragusha (born 1981), Kosovar footballer
 Marigona Dragusha (born 1990), Kosovar beauty pageant titleholder
 Mehmet Dragusha (born 1977), Kosovar footballer

Albanian-language surnames